Katchalsky is a crater that lies on the far side of the Moon. It was named after scientist Aharon Katzir-Katchalsky. It lies to the southeast of the larger crater Lobachevskiy, and to the west of the prominent King. Less than a half-crater diameter to the southeast of Katchalsky is Viviani.

The outer rim of Katchalsky is not quite circular, with outward bulges to the east and north, giving it a flat side along the northeastern edge. The rim is not markedly eroded, and the interior contains only a few tiny craterlets.

References

External links

 LTO-65D2 Katchalsky Lunar Topographic Orthophotomap, 1975 

Impact craters on the Moon